The Foreday Riders are a blues band. The band was formed in 1967, and they were influenced by The Rolling Stones, Manfred Mann, and The Yardbirds.

References

Australian blues musical groups
1967 establishments in Australia